Gila Finkelstein (born 22 September 1950) is an Israeli former politician who served as a member of the Knesset for the National Religious Party between 2003 and 2006.

Biography
Born in Tel Aviv, Finkelstein studied English and Israeli history at Tel Aviv University, where she gained a BA and a teaching certificate. She went on to gain an MA in educational management, and work as an English teacher and headmistress.

In 2003 she was elected to the Knesset on the National Religious Party list, and was appointed a Deputy Speaker of the Knesset. Finkelstein was also chairwoman of the subcommittee for Learning Disabilities, and a member of the Education, Culture and Sports committee, the committee on the Status of Women, and the committee on the Rights of the Child.

For the 2006 elections she was placed tenth on the joint National Union-National Religious Party list, but lost her seat when the alliance won only nine seats. She was placed 18th on the Jewish Home list for the 2013 elections, in which the party won 12 seats.

References

External links

1950 births
People from Tel Aviv
Tel Aviv University alumni
Israeli Jews
Heads of schools in Israel
Women members of the Knesset
Living people
National Religious Party politicians
Members of the 16th Knesset (2003–2006)
Teachers of English as a second or foreign language
Deputy Speakers of the Knesset
21st-century Israeli women politicians
Women school principals and headteachers